His Nose in the Book is a 1920 American short silent Western film directed by B. Reeves Eason and featuring Hoot Gibson.

Cast
 Hoot Gibson
 Mildred Moore
 B. Reeves Eason Jr.
 Jim Corey
 George Field
 Tom London credited as Leonard Clapham

See also
 Hoot Gibson filmography

External links
 

1920 films
1920 short films
1920 Western (genre) films
American silent short films
Films directed by B. Reeves Eason
American black-and-white films
Silent American Western (genre) films
Universal Pictures films
1920s American films